The 1989–90 St. John's Redmen men's basketball team represented St. John's University during the 1989–90 NCAA Division I men's basketball season. The team was coached by Lou Carnesecca in his twenty-second year at the school. St. John's home games are played at Alumni Hall and Madison Square Garden and the team is a member of the Big East Conference.

Off season

Departures

Class of 1989 signees

Roster

Schedule and results

|-
!colspan=9 style="background:#FF0000; color:#FFFFFF;"| Regular season

|-
!colspan=9 style="background:#FF0000; color:#FFFFFF;"| Big East tournament

|-
!colspan=9 style="background:#FF0000; color:#FFFFFF;"| NCAA tournament

Rankings

Team players drafted into the NBA

References

St. John's Red Storm men's basketball seasons
St. John's
St. John's
St John
St JOhn